Auxilium College, is a women's general degree college located at Gandhi Nagar in Vellore, Tamil Nadu. It was established in the year 1954. The college is affiliated with Thiruvalluvar University. This college offers different courses in arts, commerce and science.

Departments

Science
Physics
Chemistry
Mathematics
Biochemistry
Microbiology
Botany
Zoology
Computer Science

Arts and Commerce
Tamil
English
History
Economics
Social Work
Business Administration
Commerce
Hospital Administration

Accreditation
The college is  recognized by the University Grants Commission (UGC).

See also
Education in India
Literacy in India
List of educational institutions in Vellore
List of institutions of higher education in Tamil Nadu

References

External links

Educational institutions established in 1954
1954 establishments in Madras State
Colleges affiliated to Thiruvalluvar University
Academic institutions formerly affiliated with the University of Madras